Raghbir Mhajan , also known as Raghbir Singh Mhajan, was the first Sikh tennis line judge to officiate at Wimbledon.

Biography 
Born and raised in Kenya, Mhajan settled in London in 1972 and became the first Indian to officiate at Wimbledon. He is famed for his run-ins with John McEnroe, especially in 1981, when he was accused of being biased in his judgments.

References 

Members of the Order of the British Empire
Tennis umpires
Year of birth missing (living people)
Living people